Goatlord was an American extreme metal band from Las Vegas, Nevada, United States.

Biography
Goatlord began in 1985 although they did not release their first demo until June 1987. Their initial recording was a mixture of sludge and death metal only titled 1987 Demo.  A cult following grew and tape-traders renamed this first demo as Forever Black Dwell in Hell, a line take from the song "Unholy Black Slut".  Their second demo, Sodomize the Goat expanded Goatlord's metallic sound.  Goatlord began to change their musical style into a slower style of metal sound and continued to record only one more demo in 1991 before tensions grew about the band's progression.  The majority of the members wanted to go towards a slower, more droning approach and the debate continued until vocalist Ace Stills ventured off with his own band Doom Snake Cult.

Goatlord's received a recording contract with Turbo Records and with their remaining members, began to work on their first full-length record without Ace.  They had hired Mitch Harris of Napalm Death as their replacement vocalist.  The entire album was recorded with Mitch as the vocalist and only a few last-minute adjustments needed to be compiled before mastering. At this time Ace returned and asked to rejoin the developing band. The remaining members conceded and briefly re-united.  It was unknown to the band that when Ace laid down his vocal tracks for the album, he recorded over Mitch's vocal tracks, destroying them.  There were not any other versions of Mitch's vocals and those tracks have become lost.  While Mitch's vocals did not appear on that album, his contributions to back-up vocals did make it on the Reflections of the Solstice album.

In 2007 Nuclear War Now Productions released their CD The Last Sodomy of Mary.  This album contains nine songs that were recorded after Reflections of the Solstice but were unreleased until now.  The limited LP version comes with a second vinyl with 7 additional tracks of unreleased, live, and cover material.

Tensions ensued between the band members which led to Goatlord's dissolution in 1997. Jeff Nardone is currently in death metal band Spun in Darkness formed in 2006. Jeff Schwob has recorded under the name Schwob since 2011. Former guitarist Joe Frankulin administrated the shock website Bloodshows.com until his death in 2015, after committing a murder-suicide involving his neighbor and her 8-year-old son.

Discography

Demos 
 1987: Demo '87
 1988: Sodomize the Goat
 1991: Promo '91"

 Albums (Studio) 
 1991: Reflections of the Solstice 1992: GoatlordAlbums (Compilations)
 2003: Distorted Birth: The Demos 2007: The Last Sodomy of Mary 2015: Demo '87 / Reh '88Albums (Split)
 2004: Foreshadow / Reaper Of Man (Split with Nunslaughter)
 2019: Gravewürm / Nunslaughter / Goatlord / Funeral Nation''

Members

Final lineup
 Joe Frankulin - guitars (1985–1997; died 2015)
 Jeff Nardone - drums (1985–1997)
 Jeff Schwob - bass, vocals (1986–1997)
 Chris Gans - vocals (1991–1997)

Earlier members 
 Ace Still - vocals (1985–1991, 1991; died 2017)
 Hal Floyd - bass (1985-1986)
 Mitch Harris - vocals (1991)

Timeline

References

External links
 The official Goatlord site
 Nuclear War Now Productions

American doom metal musical groups
American black metal musical groups
American death metal musical groups
Musical groups established in 1985
Musical groups from Las Vegas
Musical groups disestablished in 1997
Musical quartets
1985 establishments in Nevada